Osborne Village is a neighbourhood of Winnipeg, Manitoba. The area is bordered by the Assiniboine River on the north and west, Harkness Station on the east (see Winnipeg RT), and the Osborne Underpass on the south.

History
Osborne Village derives its name from Osborne Street (Winnipeg Route 62), which runs through the centre of the village area. Osborne Street was named after Lieutenant Colonel William Osborne Smith (1831–1887) the first commanding officer of Military District 10, which included the City of Winnipeg.  North of the Assiniboine River, Osborne Street was adjacent to the first Fort Osborne Barracks, on the site of which is now the Provincial Legislature. 

Osborne Village is part of the original Fort Rouge area, which became part of the City of Winnipeg as Ward 1 in 1882. The Fort Rouge area started with a population of only 150, but grew to a population of tens of thousands by 1994.

The Fort Rouge area began developing as a residential suburb of Winnipeg after the construction the Osborne Street Bridge in 1882. In 1891, "The Parkline" became Winnipeg's first streetcar route, running down River Avenue from Main Street, then south on Osborne Street. A major factor in the development of the Village was the construction of the three bridges over the Assiniboine River: the Osborne Street Bridge (1882), the Maryland Bridge (1894), and the Main Street Bridge (1897).

In the early years of the 20th century, Osborne Village's Roslyn Road was developed as a wealthy residential enclave, and by 1911 was home to the mansions of a number of prominent Winnipeg families. Notable among these was the five-acre estate of A.M. Nanton and his family. In 1911, the Nanton estate had a staff of 12. Elsewhere in neighbourhood, housing was less wealthy, but still predominantly middle class. The churches along Nassau Street are evidence of the area's predominantly English and Protestant population at the time. The Victoria Hospital was built early in the century at the corner of Bole Street and River Avenue. The second public park in the City, Assiniboine Park (later to be renamed Fort Rouge Park) was situated along River Avenue in 1894.

As Winnipeg experienced significant population growth in the years following 1945, the Osborne Village area saw the development of large high-rise apartments on or near the Assiniboine riverfront.

The Midtown bridge was constructed in 1954 and opened mid-September 1955. The original Osborne Street bridge, which was built in 1882, reconstructed the 1920s and again in 1977, was refurbished in 2011/2012. Each day, 42,000 vehicles travel over the Osborne Bridge.

Osborne Village has changed greatly over the last hundred years but its rich history is still evident in the architectural details of many of its buildings, as well as in the overall pattern of settlement which has come to embody the neighbourhood.

Shoppers Drug Mart Expansion
In 2011, the Shoppers Drug Mart at 43 Osborne Street proposed a plan to expand which involved the purchase and takeover of the neighbouring building that housed Movie Village and Vi-Ann, a local Vietnamese restaurant. The proposal would increase the  store's footprint by more than double.

The city board approved the purchase in December 2011. Area residents raised a campaign to appeal and block the purchase, collecting over 4,000 signatures, but the purchase plans were upheld by a city appeals committee in February 2012.

Today

As of 2006, Osborne Village has close to 554 buildings, fulfilling uses spanning residences, commerce, institution, entertainment, recreation and offices. Osborne Village is home to over 175 businesses.

(12%) of the land is used for commercial purposes. (4.5%) are devoted to park space.

Osborne Village is a complex urban community with a rich heritage and diverse built forms. It’s appreciated as a desirable location in which to live, work, and play. As such, it continues to experience development interest. The City of Winnipeg devised a neighbourhood plan for Osborne Village in 2006.

Osborne Village is home to Winnipeg's tallest residential building outside of the downtown core: 55 Nassau Street North (see List of tallest buildings in Winnipeg).

Osborne Village is home to many of Winnipeg's emerging and well-established artists. The city's first artists' collective makes its home in the Village, as well as many dance studios and venues for bands and musicians of all kinds. 

In the summer months talented street performers perform all day long on the street corners, playing everything from guitars and drums to violins. 

For the performing arts, Osborne Village is home to the Gas Station Arts Centre, a 235-seat rental venue with a licensed bar, patio, and large stage.

Demographics 

Statistics Canada subdivides Osborne Village into three areas. River-Osborne, Roslyn, McMillan.The 2016 population of the whole of the Village is 12,745.

Transportation 
Winnipeg Transit routes that cross through the Village are: 16 Osborne-Selkirk, 18 North Main-Corydon, 60 Pembina, 68 Grosvenor and 635 Misericordia Centre (Replace 99 and 185).

Additionally, Osborne Village is served by two Transitway stations: Harkness and Osborne, with routes 64 Lindenwoods Express, 65 Grant Express, 66 Grant (local) and BLUE Line University of Manitoba/St. Norbert (Replacing 137, 160, 161, 162/170, 163, 180, 181 and 183).

Current plans are for a new bicycle-pedestrian bridge to connect McFadyen Park with Fort Rouge Park over the Assiniboine River. The bridge would be partly financed by a grant from the Winnipeg Foundation. There are three designs vying for final approval.

Canada Day

Osborne Village's Canada Day Celebration, organized by the Osborne BIZ (Business Improvement Zone), was Winnipeg's largest and longest running street festival, drawing thousands of people from Winnipeg and the surrounding areas each year. The two-day festival featured live music stages, food vendors, artisan booths, and kids' activities. The street block of Osborne Village closed for the duration of the street party. However, as of 2022, the festival was discontinued and was replaced by a weekly summer event called, Happy Fridays in the Village.

Awards

 Voted the Best Place to Live in Uptown Magazine's 2008 Best of List.
 Awarded "Canada's Great Neighbourhood" title for 2012 by Canadian Institute of Planners

References

External links 

 Osborne Village BIZ
 Gas Station Arts Centre

Neighbourhoods in Winnipeg